Dosunmu  is a surname of Nigerian origin.

People 

 Dosunmu - a former Oba (king) of Lagos in Nigeria
 Abiola Dosunmu, formerly known as Dosunmu-Elegbede-Fernandez - a Nigerian chieftain and socialite
 Adegboyega Dosunmu Amororo II - a former Oba of the Owu Kingdom in the Ogun State of Nigeria
 Andrew Dosunmu - a Nigerian photographer and filmmaker
 Ayo Dosunmu - an American basketball player
 Falolu Dosunmu - a former Oba of Lagos in Nigeria
 Tosin Dosunmu - a former Nigerian football player
 Wahab Dosunmu - a former Nigerian politician from the Lagos State